Xanthostemon is a genus of trees and shrubs, constituting part of the myrtle plant family Myrtaceae. This genus was first described in 1857 by German–Australian botanist Ferdinand von Mueller. According to different official sources between 46 and 51 species are known to science. They grow naturally in New Caledonia, Australia, the Solomon Islands and Malesia, including the Philippines, New Guinea and Indonesia. The genera Pleurocalyptus and Purpureostemon from New Caledonia are morphologically close to Xanthostemon.

Species
This listing, was sourced from the Australian Plant Name Index and Australian Plant Census, the Checklist of the Vascular Indigenous Flora of New Caledonia, new species scientific publications and cross checked with the tertiary source the Kew World Checklist of Selected Plant Families.

 Xanthostemon arenarius  – Cape York Peninsula endemic, Australia
 Xanthostemon aurantiacus  – New Caledonia endemic
 Xanthostemon bracteatus  - Luzon, Philippines
 Xanthostemon brassii  - New Guinea
 Xanthostemon carlii  – New Caledonia endemic
 Xanthostemon chrysanthus , Golden Penda – Cape York Peninsula & Wet Tropics NE. Qld endemic
Xanthostemon confertiflorus  - Sulawesi
 Xanthostemon crenulatus  – Cape York Peninsula, Wet Tropics NE. Qld, Australia, New Guinea
 Xanthostemon eucalyptoides  – WA, NT, Australia
 Xanthostemon ferrugineus  – New Caledonia endemic
 Xanthostemon formosus  – Wet Tropics NE. Qld endemic
 Xanthostemon francii  – New Caledonia endemic
 Xanthostemon fruticosus  – Philippines endemic
 Xanthostemon glaucus  – New Caledonia endemic
 Xanthostemon grandiflorus  – New Caledonia 
 Xanthostemon graniticus  – Wet Tropics NE. Qld uplands endemic, Australia
 Xanthostemon grisei  – New Caledonia endemic
 Xanthostemon gugerlii  – New Caledonia endemic
 Xanthostemon intermedius  – New Caledonia endemic
 Xanthostemon lateriflorus  – New Caledonia endemic
 Xanthostemon laurinus  – New Caledonia endemic
 Xanthostemon longipes  – New Caledonia endemic
 Xanthostemon macrophyllus  – New Caledonia endemic
 Xanthostemon melanoxylon  – Solomon Islands
 Xanthostemon multiflorus  – New Caledonia endemic
 Xanthostemon myrtifolius  – New Caledonia endemic
 Xanthostemon natunae  - Kalimantan
 Xanthostemon novoguineensis  – New Guinea
 Xanthostemon oppositifolius  – SE. & central Qld, Australia
 Xanthostemon paabaensis  – New Caledonia  
 Xanthostemon paradoxus  – WA, NT, Australia
 Xanthostemon petiolatus  – Malesia
 Xanthostemon philippinensis  - Luzon, Philippines
 Xanthostemon psidioides  – WA, NT, Australia
 Xanthostemon pubescens  – New Caledonia endemic
 Xanthostemon retusus  – New Caledonia 
 Xanthostemon ruber  – New Caledonia endemic
 Xanthostemon sebertii  – New Caledonia endemic
 Xanthostemon speciosus  - Philippines
 Xanthostemon sulfureus  – New Caledonia endemic
 Xanthostemon umbrosus  – Cape York Peninsula, Wet Tropics NE. Qld, WA, NT, Australia
 Xanthostemon verdugonianus  – Philippines endemic
 Xanthostemon velutinus  – New Caledonia endemic
 Xanthostemon verticillatus  – Wet Tropics NE. Qld endemic, Australia
 Xanthostemon verus  – Malesia
 Xanthostemon vieillardii  – New Caledonia endemic
 Xanthostemon whitei  – Wet Tropics NE. Qld endemic, Australia
 Xanthostemon xerophilus  – Cape York Peninsula endemic, Australia
 Xanthostemon youngii  – Cape York Peninsula endemic, Australia

Species provisionally named, described and accepted according to the Australian Plant Name Index  while awaiting formal publication
 Xanthostemon sp. Bolt Head (J.R.Clarkson + 8805) Qld Herbarium
 Xanthostemon sp. Obiri Rock (J.A.Estbergs s.n.) NT Herbarium

References

Cited works

External links
 

 
Taxonomy articles created by Polbot
Australasian realm flora
Flora of Malesia